Crambus unistriatellus, the wide-stripe grass-veneer, is a moth in the family Crambidae. It was described by Alpheus Spring Packard in 1867. It is found in North America, where it has been recorded from British Columbia, Alberta, Labrador, Maine, Michigan, New Hampshire, New York, Pennsylvania, Minnesota and California. The habitat consists of grasslands.

The wingspan is 25–28 mm. The forewings are chocolate brown with a silver-white discal stripe and a submarginal row of black dots. The hindwings are white. Adults have been recorded on wing from June to October.

The larvae feed on grass roots.

References

Crambini
Moths described in 1867
Moths of North America